Burway Rowing Club is a rowing club on the River Thames, based at Thameside, Laleham, Borough of Spelthorne, Surrey.

Club colours
The blade colours are dark blue and gold; kit: yellow and dark blue.

History
The club was founded in 1921 as Staines Town Rowing Club. In 1948 the club became known as Burway Rowing Club due to its location at Burway Reach. In the same year the Burway Regatta was introduced. The boathouse is located next door to the Sir William Perkins's School Boat Club.

The club has pre-trained a few British champions at senior level and principally trained many juniors winning their events at that major event, held over 2000 metres, usually in Nottingham: Holme Pierrepoint purpose-built lake.

Honours

British champions

See also
Rowing on the River Thames

References

Sport in Surrey
Rowing clubs in England
Rowing clubs of the River Thames
Buildings and structures on the River Thames